Romeo Van Dessel (born 9 April 1989) is a Belgian retired football (soccer) midfielder. He started his career at Mechelen in 2008, before completing a loan move to Antwerp in 2011. In 2012, he moved to Dender EH.

References
Guardian Football

Belgian footballers
1989 births
Living people
K.V. Mechelen players
Royal Antwerp F.C. players
F.C.V. Dender E.H. players
K. Berchem Sport players
Belgian Pro League players
Challenger Pro League players
Association football midfielders